Tonite Let’s All Make Love in London is a 1967 documentary film by Peter Whitehead. It includes sequences of “Swinging London” with accompanying contemporary pop music, concert and studio performances by musicians including the Rolling Stones and the first professional footage filmed of Pink Floyd, and several interviews. It is notable for showing footage shot inside the short-lived UFO Club, the British counter-culture night club in the basement of 31 Tottenham Court Road, and at The 14 Hour Technicolor Dream multi-artist event held in the Great Hall of the Alexandra Palace, including John Lennon. The film also shows scenes of soldiers parading in scarlet jackets and bearskins, London street scenes, a protest march, psychedelic patterns being painted on a semi-naked girl, the arrival of Playboy Bunny girls by plane, and guests including Roman Polanski and Sharon Tate, Terence Stamp, and Jim Brown arriving at the premiere of Polanski’s film Cul-de-sac.

The film has been described as "what for many critics was the definitive document of swinging London, a white-hot crucible of music, fashion and film."

Synopsis
The film self-describes as a “Pop Concerto for Film” and is divided into seven themed sections or “movements” with a prelude and a coda.

Pink Floyd – "Interstellar Overdrive" 

1. Loss of the British Empire

2. Dollygirls

3. Protest

4. It’s All Pop Music

5. Movie Stars

6. Painting Pop

7. As Scene from U.S.A.

Reception
On review aggregator Rotten Tomatoes, the film holds an approval rating of 83% based on 6 reviews.

The film was shown at the 1967 New York Film Festival, where The Daily Telegraph reported it was the “hit of the festival”.

Kim Newman described the film in Empire magazine as “An interesting and amusing documentary that captures the icons of the time in candid interviews and performances from the biggest bands around.”

Soundtrack album
A soundtrack album with the same title was released on LP in 1968.

Sources

References

External links
 

 1967 films
Concert films
Films set in London
1960s fashion
1960s in London
Counterculture of the 1960s
Culture in London
Youth culture in the United Kingdom